The rock thrushes, Monticola, are a genus of chats, medium-sized mostly insectivorous or omnivorous songbirds. All are Old World birds, and most are associated with mountainous regions.

Taxonomy
The genus was erected by the German naturalist Friedrich Boie in 1822. Monticola is the Latin word for mountain-dweller or mountaineer. The genus was formerly included in the thrush family Turdidae. Molecular phylogenetic studies published in 2004 and 2010 showed that the species are more closely related to members of the Old World flycatcher family Muscicapidae.

The genus contains the following species:

 White-winged cliff chat, Monticola semirufus (formerly in Thamnolaea)
 Cape rock thrush, Monticola rupestris
 Sentinel rock thrush, Monticola explorator
 Short-toed rock thrush, Monticola brevipes
 Miombo rock thrush, Monticola angolensis
 Common rock thrush, Monticola saxatilis
 Little rock thrush, Monticola rufocinereus
 Blue rock thrush, Monticola solitarius
 Chestnut-bellied rock thrush, Monticola rufiventris
 Blue-capped rock thrush, Monticola cinclorhyncha
 White-throated rock thrush, Monticola gularis
 Littoral rock thrush, Monticola imerinus
 Forest rock thrush, Monticola sharpei
 Benson's rock thrush, Monticola sharpei bensoni
 Amber Mountain rock thrush, Monticola erythronotus (split from M. sharpei)

Fossil record
Monticola pongraczi (Pliocene of Beremend, Hungary)

References

Further reading

External links

Rock thrush videos on the Internet Bird Collection

Chats (birds)